In the United States, there are both federal and state laws prohibiting treason. Treason is defined on the federal level in Article III, Section 3 of the United States Constitution as: "only in levying War against [the United States], or in adhering to their Enemies, giving them Aid and Comfort." Most state constitutions include similar definitions of treason, specifically limited to levying war against the state, "adhering to the enemies" of the state, or aiding the enemies of the state, and requiring two witnesses or a confession in open court. Fewer than 30 people have ever been charged with treason under these laws.

Federal
Definition: In Article III, Section 3 of the United States Constitution, treason is specifically limited to levying war against the U.S., or adhering to their enemies, giving them aid and comfort.

Penalty: Under U.S. Code Title 18, the penalty is death, or not less than five years' imprisonment (with a minimum fine of $10,000, if not sentenced to death). Any person convicted of treason against the United States also forfeits the right to hold public office in the United States.

The terms used in the definition derive from English legal tradition, specifically the Treason Act 1351. Levying war means the assembly of armed people to overthrow the government or to resist its laws. Enemies are subjects of a foreign government that is in open hostility with the United States. Treason does not distinguish between participants and accessories; all persons who rebel or intentionally give aid to hostilities are subject to the same charge. 

No person has been executed for treason by the federal government under the Constitution. The small handful of people who have been convicted of the offense at the federal level — such as two militants from the Whiskey Rebellion (John Mitchell and Philip Weigel, who were both pardoned by President George Washington) and several people after World War II — have mostly been pardoned or released.

State

Legal background 
Constitutionally, U.S. citizens owe allegiance to at least two government entities: the United States of America and their state of legal residence. They can therefore potentially commit treason against either, or against both. At least 14 people have been charged with treason against various states; at least six were convicted, five of whom were executed. Only two prosecutions for treason against a state were ever carried out in the U.S.: one against Thomas Dorr and the other after John Brown's conspiracy. It has often been discussed, both legally and in matter of policy, if states should punish treason. 

Four of the 13 colonies had enacted treason statutes by 1800, and four more had done so by 1820. The remaining four colonies had treason laws by 1862. In 2013, 43 states had treason laws, although 21 of them define this crime solely in their constitutions.

Alabama
Definition: The constitution of Alabama defines treason in similar terms to the United States Constitution.

Penalty: Not less than 10 years and not more than 99 years' imprisonment (eligible for parole after lesser of one-half of sentence or 15 years) or life imprisonment (eligible for parole after 10 years).

A treason conviction also results in loss of voting rights for life without the possibility of voting restoration.

Arkansas
Definition: Arkansas legislation defines treason similarly to the United States Constitution, limiting it to "levying war against the state" or giving "aid and comfort" to the enemies of the state. Also similarly, conviction requires the testimony of two witnesses to the same overt act, or confession in open court.

Penalty: Death, or life imprisonment without the possibility of parole (eligible for parole after 30 years if the defendant was under 18).

California
Definition: Treason against the state of California is defined similarly to the United States Constitution. The California Constitution states that "treason against the State consists only in levying war against it, adhering to its enemies, or giving them aid and comfort. A person may not be convicted of treason except on the evidence of two witnesses to the same overt act or by confession in open court." This is reiterated in Section 37 of the California Penal Code.

Penalty: Death, or life imprisonment without the possibility of parole.

Colorado
Penalty: Life imprisonment without the possibility of parole.

Delaware
Definition: The constitution of Delaware defines treason in similar terms to the United States Constitution.

Florida
Penalty: Not less than 5.5 years and not more than 30 years' imprisonment (minimum sentencing guidelines).

Georgia
Penalty: Death, or by imprisonment for life or for not less than 15 years.

Idaho
The state constitution of Idaho specifically disallows gubernatorial respite or reprieve for a conviction for treason.

Illinois
Penalty: Not less than 6 years and not more than 30 years' imprisonment.

Joseph Smith and Hyrum Smith

After escaping custody on charges of treason against Missouri and fleeing to Illinois, Joseph Smith and Hyrum Smith were charged with treason in Illinois, which at that time was a capital offense. Augustine Spencer swore out a warrant alleging that the Smith brothers had committed treason by "calling out the Legion to resist the force under the command of the Governor." On June 24, 1844, a warrant was issued charging that "Joseph Smith, late of the county aforesaid, did, on or about the nineteenth day of June. A. D. 1844, at the county and state aforesaid, commit the crime of treason against the government and people of the State of Illinois." (Ludlow, pp. 1346–1348)

Bail could not be granted for a charge of treason, so Smith was placed in jail where he was accompanied by his brother, Hyrum Smith, and other associates. On June 27, Smith and Hyrum were killed by a mob in jail while they were awaiting trial. (Ludlow, p. 860)

Louisiana
Penalty: Death, or life imprisonment. In Louisiana, all life imprisonment sentences exclude the possibility of parole.

Maine
Definition: The state constitution of Maine defines treason in similar terms to the United States Constitution.

Massachusetts
Penalty: Life imprisonment with the possibility of parole after serving not less than 15 years and not more than 25 years.

Minnesota
Penalty: Life imprisonment with the possibility of parole after serving 17 years.

Mississippi
Penalty: Death or life imprisonment.

Missouri
Definition: Treason is defined in the constitution of the State of Missouri.

Penalty: Not less than 10 years and not more than 30 years' imprisonment (eligible for parole after serving one-half of sentence) or life imprisonment (eligible for parole after serving 30 years).

Joseph Smith and others
Joseph Smith and five others were charged with treason under Missouri law in 1838, spending over five months in prison, but escaped while awaiting trial. Joseph Smith and Hyrum Smith were later charged with treason against Illinois (above).

Nevada
Penalty: Not less than 2 years and not more than 10 years' imprisonment (if imprisonment is imposed).

New York
Penalty: 15-40 years in prison or Life imprisonment and a $100,000 fine. Though treason doesn't have a New York Penal Law Statute, it is punished as a class A-1 felony.

Mark Lynch, Aspinwall Cornell, and John Hagerman 
During the War of 1812, Mark Lynch, Aspinwall Cornell, and John Hagerman sold supplies to British ships. However, the court dismissed the indictments because it was deemed the war was against the United States and not the state of New York.

North Carolina
Article I, Section 29, of the State Constitution is similar to Article III, Section 3 of the United States Constitution, limiting the legal definition of "treason" to levying war against the State or giving "aid and comfort" to the enemies of the State. Conviction requires two witnesses to the act itself, or a confession in open court.

John Sevier
John Sevier, then governor of the State of Franklin and later the first governor of the State of Tennessee, was charged with treason against the State of North Carolina in October 1788. After being transported to North Carolina, he was freed. The charge was never brought to trial.

North Dakota
Penalty: Not more than 20 years' imprisonment.

Oregon
Penalty: Life imprisonment with the possibility of parole after serving 25 years.

Pennsylvania 
On 1892, after the Homestead strikes, Hugh O'Donnell and others were inducted for treason, .

Rhode Island
Penalty: Life imprisonment with the possibility of parole after serving 20 years.

Thomas Dorr
Thomas Wilson Dorr was convicted of treason against Rhode Island in 1844 for leading a rebellion against the state government, and sentenced to life imprisonment. Dorr served twelve months of his sentence. He was released in 1845 after the Rhode Island state legislature passed an Act of General Amnesty. In January 1854 the legislature passed an act annulling the verdict of the Rhode Island Supreme Court.

South Carolina
Penalty: Death or not more than 30 years' imprisonment (if committed during time of war) or not more than 20 years' imprisonment (if not committed during time of war).

South Dakota
Definition: The state constitution of South Dakota defines treason in similar terms to the United States Constitution.

Tennessee
Tennessee has repealed its treason law. However, a person convicted of treason can never be eligible to vote in Tennessee.

Texas
Penalty: Not less than 1 year and not more than 20 years' imprisonment.

Vermont
Definition: levying war or conspiring to levy war against the state, or adhering to the enemy. This definition, in Title 13, Chapter 75, § 3401 of Vermont Statutes, echoes the definition found in the United States Constitution.

Penalty: Death by electrocution. Vermont criminal law maintains capital punishment specifically for treason. No other crime is punishable by death. The method of execution is specified as electrocution. Vermont's electric chair, last used in 1954, is stored in the Vermont History Center in Barre, Vermont.

Virginia
Penalty: Not less than 20 years' imprisonment or life imprisonment with the possibility of parole after serving 15 years (if imprisonment is imposed).

Raid on Harper's Ferry
John Brown was charged with treason against the Commonwealth of Virginia, along with conspiracy and first-degree murders after he led his raid on Harper's Ferry in 1859. In Virginia v. John Brown, he was found guilty on all three charges and hanged. Edwin Coppie (also known as Edwin Coppock) and Aaron Dwight Stevens were also charged, convicted, and hanged for treason against the Commonwealth of Virginia and other crimes. The charges of treason against John Anthony Copeland Jr. and Shields Green were dropped, since their lawyer argued successfully that since they were not citizens of the United States, according to the Dred Scott decision, they could not commit treason; they were convicted and hanged for other crimes. Albert Hazlett and John E. Cooke were charged with treason against the Commonwealth of Virginia and found not guilty of treason, but were convicted of other crimes.

Washington
Definition: The state constitution and statutory law of Washington define treason in similar terms to the United States Constitution, except that adhering to enemies and giving them aid are distinct forms of treason, not elements of a single form.

Penalty: Life imprisonment with the possibility of parole after serving 20 years, or any term of years. Treason is a "Class A" felony under sentencing guidelines, and current guidelines provide for a maximum sentence of life in prison and/or a $50,000 fine.

West Virginia
Penalty: Life imprisonment with the possibility of parole after serving 10 years or not less than 3 years and not more than 10 years' imprisonment (latter sentence able to be imposed at discretion of jury or court if defendant pleads guilty).

Wisconsin
Penalty: Life imprisonment with or without the possibility of parole (eligible in 20 years, if sentenced to life with parole).

Tribal law
While treason is a criminal matter under federal and state laws, it may be considered a civil matter under tribal law. The U.S. federal government recognizes tribal nations as "domestic dependent nations". Tribal sovereignty is a form of parallel sovereignty within the U.S. constitutional framework, constrained by but not subordinate to other sovereign entities.  The Indian Civil Rights Act limits sentences for crimes by tribal courts to no more than one year in jail and a $5,000 fine.

There is at least one case of punishment for treason under tribal law. In 1992, the Tonawanda Band of Seneca convicted several members of treason, stripped their tribal membership, and sentenced them to permanent banishment from the Tonawanda Reservation for attempting to overthrow the traditional government.

See also
Article Three of the United States Constitution

References

State law in the United States
United States criminal law

Treason in the United States
United States criminal constitutional law